The Daytime Emmy Award for Outstanding Supporting Actress in a Drama Series is an award presented annually by the National Academy of Television Arts and Sciences (NATAS) and Academy of Television Arts & Sciences (ATAS). It is given to honor an actress who has delivered an outstanding performance in a supporting role while working within the daytime drama industry.

At the 6th Daytime Emmy Awards held in 1979, Suzanne Rogers was the first winner of this award, for her role as Maggie Horton on Days of Our Lives. The awards ceremony was not aired on television in 1983 and 1984, having been criticized for voting integrity. Following the introduction of a new category in 1985, Outstanding Younger Actress in a Drama Series, one criterion for this category was altered, requiring all actresses to be aged 26 or above.

Since its inception, the award has been given to 36 actresses. General Hospital is the soap opera with the most awarded actresses, with a total of nine. In 1989, Nancy Lee Grahn and Debbi Morgan made Daytime Emmy Award history when they tied in this category. Morgan also became the first African-American woman to have garnered the award. Julia Barr, Tamara Braun, Grahn, Amelia Heinle, and Gina Tognoni are the only actresses to have won the award twice. Heinle is the only one to have won it, consecutively. Grahn, Heather Tom and Melissa Claire Egan have the most nominations in this category, with a total of five. 

As of the 2022 ceremony, Kelly Thiebaud is the most recent winner in this category, for her role as Dr. Britt Westbourne on General Hospital.

Winners and nominees

 

	

Listed below are the winners of the award for each year, as well as the other nominees.

1970s

1980s

1990s

2000s

2010s

2020s

Multiple wins and nominations

The following individuals received two wins in this category:

The following individuals received two or more nominations in this category:

Series with most awards

References

External links
 

Daytime Emmy Awards
Emmy
Awards established in 1979